München Neu Freimann is a post World War II displaced person camp in the American sector. The camp was located in Schwabing-Freimann and opened in July 1946. Residents were housed in confiscated workers' housing.

External links
https://web.archive.org/web/20081107022309/http://www.ushmm.org/museum/exhibit/online/dp/camp19.htm

Displaced persons camps in the aftermath of World War II
History of Munich